Kessleria diabolica is a moth of the family Yponomeutidae. It is found in central Spain.

The length of the forewings is 6.3 mm. The forewings are whitish with brown scales. The hindwings are dark grey. Adults have been recorded in July.

References

Moths described in 1992
Yponomeutidae